Hepburn Avenue is an arterial east-west road in the northern suburbs of Perth, Western Australia. The road links Sorrento in the west with Malaga and Whiteman in the east. It also connects the residential developments that span its length with several local facilities, as well as major road routes into central Perth.

History
The road was built in the 1980s to meet suburban demand and was originally proposed on the Metropolitan Region Scheme as a freeway. It was named after Alistair Hepburn (1915-2004), one of the drafters of the Scheme together with Professor Gordon Stephenson (1908–1997). Between 1986 and 1988, Hepburn Avenue represented the northern terminus of the Mitchell Freeway.

Subsequent additions east of Wanneroo Road, the original terminus, have been built in stages — in the late 1990s it was extended further east, reaching Alexander Drive in 2005, and extending to Beechboro Road in October 2010. The opening of the extension was delayed several months due to street lighting issues. Construction began on the next  extension through to Marshall Road in August 2010, and was opened in June 2012.

Works to upgrade Hepburn Avenue to a dual carriageway were constructed between the late 2000s to the early 2010s. The first stage was from Wanneroo Road to Giralt Road, completed in the late 2000s. Next was from Alexander Drive to Mirrabooka Avenue, completed in 2010. The remaining part between Mirrabooka Avenue and Bellerive Boulevard was upgraded in 2012. The last section to become a dual carriageway, east of Alexander Drive was completed in 2017.

During 2018—19, the eastern end of Hepburn Avenue was upgraded to link with a realigned Beechboro Road North at a grade separated roundabout interchange with Tonkin Highway as part of NorthLink WA.

Route description

Hepburn Avenue begins at a roundabout, joining with West Coast Drive, Whitfords Avenue and Hillarys Boat Harbour carpark, and ends at a roundabout interchange at Tonkin Highway, continuing eastwards as Beechboro Road North. Hepburn Avenue provides direct access to Kingsway City shopping centre in Madeley and St Stephen's School in Duncraig, as well as the Greenwood railway station, which was constructed at the Mitchell Freeway interchange, and opened in January 2005.  Hepburn Avenue is a four lane dual carriageway for its entire length (an exception was the section between Beechboro Road North and Marshall Road but this was removed with the development of NorthLink WA). Hepburn Avenue is allocated State Route 82 for its entire length from 2019 onwards; before then this allocation only extended eastwards to Wanneroo Road.

Hillarys Boat Harbour to Wanneroo Road 
Hepburn Avenue commences at the roundabout just east of the main entrance to the Hillarys Boat Harbour, with Whitfords Avenue to the north and West Coast Drive to the south. From that roundabout, Hepburn Avenue runs for  bordering the suburbs of Hillarys to the north and Sorrento to the south before encountering a traffic light controlled intersection at fellow arterial road Marmion Avenue. Following this intersection Hepburn Avenue runs for  bordering Padbury to the north and Duncraig to the south and encountering some local roads and providing access to St Stephen’s School, before encountering Mitchell Freeway at a standard diamond interchange. The southbound entrance ramp to the freeway provides access to Greenwood railway station. This intersection marks the former eastern terminus of State Route 82, and Wanneroo Road is the boundary of both the City of Joondalup and Wanneroo local government areas.

East of Wanneroo Road 
Following the Wanneroo Road intersection, Hepburn Avenue is now within the City of Wanneroo. For , Hepburn Avenue borders Madeley to the north and Marangaroo to the south, during which it provides access to the Kingsway City shopping centre and local sporting areas in Madeley. The road then reaches Hartman Drive at a roundabout, with the suburb boundary to the north changing to Darch. Hepburn Avenue reaches Mirrabooka Avenue at a roundabout  later, after which Hepburn Avenue borders Landsdale to the north and Alexander Heights to the south for another  before reaching Alexander Drive at a traffic light controlled intersection.

Hepburn Avenue then heads into the City of Swan LGA, now bordering Cullacabardee to the north and Ballajura to the south. It curves to the southeast and does so for the next , intersecting with Marangaroo Drive, Lakefarm Retreat, and Bellefin Drive, before finally terminating at a roundabout interchange at Tonkin Highway and continuing southwards as Beechboro Road North following the interchange.

Major intersections

  Whitfords Avenue (Tourist Drive 204) north / West Coast Drive (Tourist Drive 204) south, Hillarys and Sorrento
  Marmion Avenue (State Route 71), Hillarys, Sorrento, Padbury and Duncraig
 Gibson Avenue, Padbury
 Lilburne Road, Duncraig
 Glengarry Drive, Duncraig
  Mitchell Freeway (State Route 2), Padbury, Duncraig, Kingsley and Greenwood
 Kingsley Drive, Kingsley
 Barridale Drive, Kingsley
 Allenswood Road, Greenwood
 Moolanda Boulevard, Kingsley
 Cockman Road, Greenwood
  Wanneroo Road (State Route 60), Kingsley, Greenwood, Madeley and Marangaroo
 Hartman Dr, Madeley, Marangaroo and Darch
 Mirrabooka Avenue, Darch, Marangaroo, Landsdale and Alexander Heights
  Alexander Drive (State Route 56), Alexander Heights
  Marangaroo Drive (State Route 81) Ballajura and Cullacabardee
  Tonkin Highway, Ballajura, Whiteman and Cullacabardee (roundabout interchange, continues as  Beechboro Road North eastwards)

Former intersections
 Marshall Road, Malaga (removed as part of NorthLink WA)

See also

References

Roads in Perth, Western Australia
Articles containing video clips